Robert T. "Bob" Welch (born June 8, 1958) is an American lobbyist and former Republican politician.  He served 10 years in the Wisconsin State Senate and 10 years in the State Assembly, and was an unsuccessful candidate for United States Senate in 1994 and 2004.

Biography

Born in Berlin, Wisconsin, Welch graduated from Ripon College and went to Madison Area Technical College, where he was trained to be a surveyor. He served in the Wisconsin State Assembly from 1985 to 1995.  Rather than run for re-election in 1994, he chose to run for United States Senate and was defeated by Herb Kohl.

Shortly after the 1994 election, incumbent state senator Joseph Leean announced he would resign to accept an appointment from the Governor.  Welch won the 1995 special election to fill the remainder of his term.  He was subsequently elected to a full term in 1996 and 2000.  In 2004, he again deferred re-election for an attempt at election to the United States Senate, but came in a distant 3rd in the Republican primary.  He left office in January 2005.

After leaving office, Welch formed a lobbying firm, Welch Group Public Affairs, with his wife, Jeanne.  Their son, Peter, also works for the company as Chief Operating Officer.

References

External links
 
 Our Campaigns – Robert Welch (WI) profile

|-

|-

People from Berlin, Wisconsin
Madison Area Technical College alumni
Ripon College (Wisconsin) alumni
Republican Party Wisconsin state senators
Republican Party members of the Wisconsin State Assembly
1958 births
Living people
Candidates in the 2004 United States elections
21st-century American politicians